Aun Gallery is a contemporary art gallery in Iran's capital city Tehran. It is owned and created by Afarin Neyssari. The gallery comprises two exhibitions halls for dual exhibitions based in the: Sheikh Bahaei area in northern Tehran. Aun calls itself the Iran's first commercial art space designed and built to showcase contemporary art. The building offers 120 square meters of open exhibition space, a five-meter high ceiling and a paneled roof to provide maximum natural light. The gallery's unique architectural features allow for exhibitions of various arts including painting, photography, sculpture, video, installation and performance.

History
Aun Gallery was established in September 2009 to promote young Iranian artists and support their contribution to Iran's cultural scene. The gallery holds ten to eleven solo exhibits per year, lasting approximately one month at a time. The gallery also hosted mixed media sculpture specialist Bita Fayyazi in 2009.

The Vanak area has been popular with Iranian artists since the early 2000s, at which time it was a quiet residential area with light industry. More recently it has undergone extensive redevelopment with cafes, restaurants and media businesses. Sheikh Bahaei Square is a prime site with a central area of dining areas and shopping precincts.

Imprisonment of Owner 
Aun's owner, Afarin Neyssari, and her husband Karan Vafadari were arrested in Tehran’s Imam Khomeini International Airport by Iran’s Islamic Revolutionary Guards Intelligence Service (IRGIS) on 20 July 2016 when she was about to board a plane to travel to Italy in order to jump start an important art project, which was to prepare for Mr. Bizhan Bassiri’s solo exhibition at the Venice Biennale festival as approved and certified by the Tehran Museum of Contemporary Art and the Minister of Culture. Karan was supposed to join her a few days later on their trip, and to visit his three children who live in the US.  Karan received a call from Afarin, and when he went to see her he too was arrested.

Afarin and Karan were held in solitary confinement for over one month, and were not allowed to speak to a lawyer for 5 months. Afarin first spoke to a lawyer when she first showed up in court, 5 months after imprisonment. The Iranian judiciary has coerced the family to dismiss their chosen lawyer multiple times, and as of May 2017, they still have not found a suitable lawyer. As a Zoroastrian, Karan could be another example in a history of confiscation of Zoroastrians' property.

Karan is a US citizen, and Afarin is a Greencard holder. A wave of public support for Karan and Afarin followed, from the artistic community within Iran, as well as from customers and friends of Aun Gallery. Robert Toscano, former ambassador from Italy to Iran, refuted the authorities’ justification for their detention in an open letter, saying that “One has to be truly gullible and the easy victim of propaganda” to accept such charges. He continued, “The reason must be a different one…political blackmail toward the US (of which [she is] also citizens), envy for their success, intimidation toward the Zoroastrian community, desire to grab their properties, [and] repression of contemporary art.”

Media
Aun Gallery has appeared in magazines and publications such as Bidoun, as well as other local and international publications.

The gallery also featured in international travel magazine websites and online magazine The Culture Trip.

Aun Gallery was also instrumental in the creation of the Tehran Gallery Guide, a dual English and Persian publication highlighting the upcoming month's art events in the Iranian capital. The publication ceased production in 2012.

International work
Aun's artists have exhibited globally with the gallery itself taking a summer excursion to the show fives artists' work in the Sydney Biennale in 2012.

Artists
Artists shown at the gallery include:

Abbas Akbari
Alireza Chalipa
Alireza Jodey
Amin Aghaei
Amirali Navaee
Azadeh Baloochi
Azin Osati
Behnam Kamrani
Bita Fayyazi
Bobak Etminani
Darvish Fakhr
Einoddin Sadeghzadeh
Elmira Roozbeh
Estabragh Mousavi Fard
Farideh Shahsavarani
Golnar Adili
Hossein Zeynalpour
Koorosh Angali
Kourosh Golnari
Mansour Vakili
Maryam Khosrovani
Mehdi Nabavi
Mohammad Bahabadi
Mohammad Hossein Emad
Mohammad Keyvan
Mohsen Jamalinik
Morteza Talebi
Nafiseh Emran
Nazgol Ansarinia
Nouriman Manouchehrifar
Omid Bazmandegan
Omid Hallaj
Parham Taghioff
Pooya Aryanpour
Rima Eslammaslak
Sahar Khalkhalian
Samaneh Rahbarnia
Setare Sanjari
Shahrzad Monem
Shaqayeq Arabi
Shaya Shahrestani
Tabassom Taham
Yasser Mirzaee
Zanbagh Lotfi

See also 
 Iranian modern and contemporary art
 List of Iranian artists

References

External links

 Foreign Residency Artist on Vimeo

2009 establishments in Iran
Art galleries established in 2009
Contemporary art galleries in Iran
Buildings and structures in Tehran
Tourist attractions in Tehran
Culture in Tehran